In 2009, Hull F.C. competed in their twelfth Super League season, in their 145th year after the club's foundation in 1865. They also competed in the 2009 Challenge Cup.

Transfers
Transfers for 2009 (In)

†: Subject to successful visa application. This process was initially delayed due to Crocker's past conviction of affray in 2005. On 29 January 2009, Hull FC confirmed Crocker's visa application had been rejected. 

Transfers for 2009 (Out)

Full squad

Fixtures and results

League table

External links
 Hull F.C.'s official website

Hull F.C. seasons
Hull F.C. season